The Navarre Football Federation (FNF; , NFF) is the football association responsible for all competitions of any form of football developed in Navarre. It is integrated into the Royal Spanish Football Federation and its headquarters are located in Pamplona.

Competitions
 Men's
 Tercera División (Group 15)
 Primera Autonómica (1 group)
 Regional Preferente (2 groups)
 Primera Regional (4 groups)
 Youth
 Liga Nacional Juvenil Group XVI
 Divisiones Regionales
 Women's
 Divisiones Regionales

See also 
Navarre autonomous football team
List of Spanish regional football federations

References

External links 
  

Spanish football associations
Sports organizations established in 1928
Football in Navarre
1928 establishments in Spain